Barber Creek is a stream in the U.S. state of Georgia. It is a tributary to McNutt Creek.

Barber Creek was named after Robert Barber, a pioneer citizen. A variant name is "Barbers Creek".

References

Rivers of Georgia (U.S. state)
Rivers of Barrow County, Georgia
Rivers of Clarke County, Georgia
Rivers of Oconee County, Georgia